Thought Crimes: The Case of the Cannibal Cop is a 2015 American documentary film directed and produced by Erin Lee Carr. The film follows Gilberto Valle, a former NYPD cop was charged with conspiring to kidnap and eat women.

The film had its world premiere at the Tribeca Film Festival on April 20, 2015. It was released on May 11, 2015, by HBO.

Plot
The film follows Gilberto Valle, a former NYPD cop, who was charged with conspiring to kidnap and eat women. Facing a life sentence Valle argued it was a fantasy and had no real plans, which lead to a stunning reversal. Valle, Violet Blue, Joseph DeMarco, Gary Allen, James A. Cohen, Daniel Engber, David Greenfield, Dareh Gregorian, Alan Dershowitz, Robert Kolker, Chris Kraft, Erin Murphy, Laurie Penny, Jane Rosenberg, Lee Rowland, Maria Tatar, and Michael Welner appear in the film.

Release
The film had its world premiere at the Tribeca Film Festival on April 20, 2015. It was released on May 11, 2015, by HBO. It was produced for HBO Documentary Films

Reception

Critical reception
Thought Crimes: The Case of the Cannibal Cop holds a 89% approval rating on review aggregator website Rotten Tomatoes, based on 9 reviews, with a weighted average of 6.20/10.

References

External links

2015 films
2015 documentary films
American documentary films
Documentary films about crime in the United States
Films directed by Erin Lee Carr
HBO documentary films
2010s English-language films
2010s American films